Capperia irkutica is a moth of the family Pterophoridae. It is found in Irkutsk Oblast, Russia.

References
 , 1989: Die Pterophoriden (Lepidoptera) der sowjetisch-finnischen Siberienexpeditionen 1982-1984 mit beschreibung einer neuen art. Annales Entomologici Fennici 55: 153-160.

Moths described in 1989
Oxyptilini